Raymond Hunt (17 September 1921 – 15 August 1994) was a New Zealand cricketer. He played first-class cricket for Otago and Canterbury between 1947 and 1960.

See also
 List of Otago representative cricketers

References

External links
 

1921 births
1994 deaths
New Zealand cricketers
Canterbury cricketers
Otago cricketers
Cricketers from Dunedin